R. D. Reid (September 22, 1944 - June 20, 2017) was a Canadian character actor known for his portrayal of Sergeant Purley Stebbins in the A&E TV original series, A Nero Wolfe Mystery (2001–2002), and the series pilot, The Golden Spiders: A Nero Wolfe Mystery (2000). He appeared in Zack Snyder's Dawn of the Dead, and George A. Romero's Diary of the Dead. His other film appearances include Santa Who? (2000), Capote (2005) Half Baked (1998), Lars and the Real Girl (2007) and You Are Here (2010). He also starred in the indie horror film Silent But Deadly. 

Reid died on June 20, 2017 in Canada.

Filmography

References

External links

1944 births
2017 deaths
Canadian male film actors
Canadian male television actors
20th-century Canadian male actors
21st-century Canadian male actors